The Mighty Ducks is a media franchise spawned from the 1992 sports film of the same name.

The Mighty Ducks or Mighty Ducks may also refer to:

The Mighty Ducks (film), the original 1992 hockey film
D2: The Mighty Ducks, the 1994 sequel film
D3: The Mighty Ducks, the 1996 sequel film
Mighty Ducks: The Animated Series, a 1996 animated television series
The Mighty Ducks: Game Changers, a 2021 live-action television series
Mighty Ducks of Anaheim, now the Anaheim Ducks, a National Hockey League team
Cincinnati Mighty Ducks, an American Hockey League team